Black & Blue is an album released by Harold Melvin & the Blue Notes on the Philadelphia International record label in September 1973. It was produced by Kenneth Gamble & Leon Huff.

The album features the hit singles "The Love I Lost" and "Satisfaction Guaranteed (Or Your Love Back)". The B-side of "Satisfaction Guaranteed (Or Your Love Back)", "I'm Weak for You", also made the R&B chart.

The album was remastered and reissued with bonus tracks in 2010 by Big Break Records.

Track listing

Personnel
Harold Melvin, Teddy Pendergrass, Bernard Wilson, Lawrence Brown, Lloyd Parks – vocals
MFSB – music

Charts

Singles

References

External links
 

1973 albums
Harold Melvin & the Blue Notes albums
Albums produced by Kenneth Gamble
Albums produced by Leon Huff
Albums arranged by Bobby Martin
Albums recorded at Sigma Sound Studios
Philadelphia International Records albums